Samson and Delilah is a 1984 television film adaptation of the biblical story of Samson and Delilah directed by Lee Philips and starring Max von Sydow, Belinda Bauer, Antony Hamilton, Daniel Stern and Victor Mature. Mature played Samson in the 1949 film and had a small cameo as the father of Antony Hamilton's Samson. This was his final acting role. Based on the 1962 novel Husband of Delilah by Eric Linklater, Samson and Delilah originally aired on ABC.

Plot
The film is mostly the same as the original Biblical story, but with notable differences such as, once again, the expanded and sympathetic role of Delilah (Bauer), the introduction of the garrison commander (Stern) who is friends with Samson (Hamilton), more focus upon Samson's relationship with his first wife, a different handling of the 30 garments bet, and, perhaps the most crucial alteration of the climax. In the original story, maintained in the 1949 film and the 1996 film, Samson only regains his strength after his hair has grown long again, thus allowing him to tear down the Philistine temple. In this movie, however, Samson is taken to the Philistine temple just after his hair has been cut short, and he prays to God to restore his immense strength despite his short hair, and God complies, allowing Samson enough strength to tear down the stone pillars, thus destroying the temple. Delilah is saved through what looks like the intervention of God. She brings Samson back to his tribe to be buried. Philistea is portrayed as a theocracy with the high priest of Dagon as overlord. One might note that good Philistines, most notably Delilah and her surroundings, are given an Egyptian air while evil ones have a rather Mediterranean air. Indeed, the Philistines were originally a European people related to the Greeks that entered the Middle East through the Doric migrations around 1200 BC.

Cast
 Antony Hamilton as Samson
 Belinda Bauer as Delilah
 Angélica Aragón as Nija
 David Byrd as Elon
 David S. Eisner as Arin
 José Ferrer as The High Priest
 Jennifer Holmes as Varinia
 Stephen Macht as Maluck
 Victor Mature as Manoah
 Clive Revill as Raul
 Rene Ruis as The Temple Man
 Maria Schell as Deborah
 Brandon Scott as The Magician
 Daniel Stern as Micah
 Max von Sydow as Sidka

Production
Mature says he told the producer "I'll play Samson's father if the price is right." It was entirely shot in Mexico.

Award nominations

References

External links
 
 

1984 television films
1984 films
American television films
Films about Samson
Films based on British novels
Films shot in Mexico
Films directed by Lee Philips
Films with screenplays by John Gay (screenwriter)
ABC Motion Pictures films
1980s English-language films